Seana Bhràigh is a mountain east of Ullapool, in the Highlands of Scotland.

Ascent

The main approach is from the A835 road through the Lael Forest then over the Coire an Lochain Sgeirich ridge at the head of Gleann a' Mhadaidh. The base of the hill is then reached across pathless boggy terrain, keeping the cliffs of Cadha Dearg to the north. This makes Seana Bhràigh one of the two most inaccessible Scottish hills, along with A' Mhaighdean, north of Kinlochewe. A ski approach is possible in winter, providing a "superb" run from the summit to Strath Mulzie.

Geography and geology

Seana Bhràigh is the highest point of the upper Strath Mulzie plateau.

Loch Luchd Coire lies below the summit ridge and the larger Loch a' Choire Mhoir at lower elevation at the head of Strath Mulzie.

Although the cliffs are impressive the summer rock climbing potential is poor. The rock is schist and the crags are broken and vegetated. The potential is greater in winter and routes were pioneered from 1962–65.

Notes

References
 
 Strang, Tom (1982) The Northern Highlands. Edinburgh. Scottish Mountaineering Trust.

Munros
Marilyns of Scotland
Mountains and hills of the Northwest Highlands